Rose oxide is a  fragrance chemical found in roses and rose oil.  It also contributes to the flavor of some fruits, such as lychee, and wines, such as Gewürztraminer.

Chemistry
Rose oxide is an organic compound of the pyran class of monoterpenes.  The compound has a cis- and a trans-isomer, each with a (+)- and (−)-stereoisomer, but only the (−)-cis isomer (odor threshold 0.5 ppb) is responsible for the typical rose (floral green) fragrance.

Production
Rose oxide can be produced industrially beginning with photooxygenation of citronellol to give the allyl hydroperoxide which is then reduced with sodium sulfite to provide the diol.  Ring-closure with sulfuric acid forms both the cis- and trans-isomers in equal amounts.

References

Alkene derivatives
Tetrahydropyrans
Monoterpenes